Sầm Ngọc Đức (born 18 May 1992) is a Vietnamese footballer who plays as a full-back for V.League 1 club Công An Hà Nội.

Sầm Ngọc Đức began his professional career with Hà Nội. He then played in the V.League 1 with Hồ Chí Minh City, before joining Công An Hà Nội in 2023.

Honours
Hanoi FC
V.League 1: 2013, 2016
Vietnamese Cup runner-up: 2015, 2016
Vietnamese Super Cup runner-up: 2014, 2016, 2017

Ho Chi Minh City FC
V.League 1 runner-up: 2019
Vietnamese Super Cup runner-up: 2020

External links

References

1992 births
Living people
Vietnamese footballers
Association football fullbacks
V.League 1 players
Hanoi FC players
Ho Chi Minh City FC players
Vietnam international footballers
People from Nghệ An province